"Here for the Party" is a song co-written and recorded by American country music artist Gretchen Wilson.  It was released in July 2004 as the second single and title track from her album Here for the Party. The song was Wilson's second chart entry on the country charts.  It has been certified Gold by the RIAA.  Wilson wrote this song with Big Kenny and John Rich, who comprise Big & Rich.

Music video
A music video was released for the song, directed by Deaton Flanigen and Gary Halverson, and filmed live in concert in Las Vegas, and during CMA Fest in Nashville.

Chart performance

Year-end charts

References

2004 singles
Gretchen Wilson songs
Songs written by Big Kenny
Songs written by John Rich
Songs written by Gretchen Wilson
Epic Records singles
Music videos directed by Deaton-Flanigen Productions
Song recordings produced by Mark Wright (record producer)
2004 songs